Min Thu is the former union minister of Union Government Office of Myanmar.He also served as deputy minister of the president office under Aung San Suu Kyi.

Early life and education 
Myint Thu was born in Taunggyi, Shan State.He graduated from the 20th intake of Defence Services Academy, and received a bachelor's degree, and a master's degree in defence studies.

Career

Tatmadaw and Air Bagan
After graduating from the DSA, he served in the military and eventually retired as deputy chief of staff at Myeik Air Force Base, later working for Air Bagan.

Government 
In 2016, the NLD Government appointed him as a member of Naypyidaw Council.In December 2016, he became the deputy minister of president office under the union minister Aung San Suu Kyi.In November 2018, Myint Thu was appointed as union minister for Union Government Office Ministry.

In the aftermath of the military-led 2021 Myanmar coup d'état, the Tatmadaw appointed Lieutenant General Soe Htut as Min Thu's successor for union government office minister on 1 February 2021.

References 

Living people
Government ministers of Myanmar
1956 births